Itinerary is a live album by soprano saxophonist Steve Lacy, which was recorded in Vienna in 1990 and first released on the hat ART label in 1991.

Reception

The Allmusic review by Thom Jurek stated "With the various timbres and modal inventions that erupt from Lacy's charts, feeling is at their root, an optimism that expresses music as an end to transformation, a manner of transferring the emotion necessary to conceive change. And on Itinerary, Lacy juxtaposes numerous kinds of music to achieve that end: European classical music and its 20th century cousin, free blowing, sweetly swinging group and individual approaches to the entire history of jazz, film, and even poetry. This is a side of Lacy no one had ever heard before, and it's too bad it's not a direction he continued to pursue on a larger scale over a longer period of time. These recordings may be over a decade old, but they still point the way to a bright and shining musical vision for the future".

Track listing
All compositions by Steve Lacy
 "I Feel a Draft" – 4:04
 "Cloudy" – 5:56
 "Rain" – 6:01
 "The Sun" – 5:46
 "Moon" – 7:19
 "Sweet 16" – 14:05
 "Itinerary" – 9:48

Personnel
Steve Lacy – soprano saxophone
Steve Potts – alto saxophone, soprano saxophone
Bobby Few – piano 
Irene Aebi – cello, violin, vocals
Jean-Jacques Avenel – bass 
John Betsch – drums
Andreas Kolbe – flute, piccolo
Urs Leimgruber – soprano saxophone, tenor saxophone
Hans Steiner – bass clarinet
Franz Koglmann – flugelhorn
Klaus Peham – trumpet
Glenn Ferris – trombone
Radu Malfatti – trombone
Raoul Herget – tuba
Burkhard Stangl – guitar
Gyde Knebusch – harp
Sam Kelly – percussion
Gustave Bauer – conductor

References

Steve Lacy (saxophonist) live albums
1991 live albums
Hathut Records live albums